Eucalyptus leptophleba, commonly known as Molloy red box or Molloy box, is a species of tree that is endemic to Queensland. It has rough, fissured bark on the trunk and branches, lance-shaped or curved adult leaves, flowers buds on a branching peduncle on the ends of branchlets, white flowers and cup-shaped to barrel-shaped fruit.

Description
It has grey box-type bark that is finely fissured and rough to the small branches. The adult leaves are more or less the same dull green to blue-green on both sides and have a pointed apex. It blooms between January and June producing white flowers.

Taxonomy and naming
Eucalyptus leptophleba was first formally described in 1859 by the botanist Ferdinand von Mueller in the Journal of the Proceedings of the Linnean Society, Botany. The specific epithet is said to be derived from the Greek words leptos meaning "fine", "small" or "thin" and phlebos meaning "vein", in reference to the thin veins found on the leaves. The proper word for "vein" in ancient Greek is phleps (φλέψ).

Eucalyptus leptophleba belongs to the subgenus Symphyomyrtus section Adnataria, commonly known as boxes. It is very closely related to E. patellaris.

Distribution
Molloy red box is endemic to parts of northern Queensland, from the Hughenden and Croydon areas in the south up to the more arid western part of the Atherton Tablelands. It is also found on the eastern side of the Cape York Peninsula including on Thursday Island in the Torres Strait. Some smaller populations are found on the western portion of the Cape York Peninsula around Weipa and to the north west of Mungana.

Conservation status
This eucalypt is classified as "least concern" under the Queensland Government Nature Conservation Act 1992.

See also
List of Eucalyptus species

References

Trees of Australia
leptophleba
Myrtales of Australia
Flora of Queensland
Taxa named by Ferdinand von Mueller
Plants described in 1859